The Ta'ang National Liberation Army (abbreviated TNLA) in Myanmar (Burma), is the armed wing of the Palaung State Liberation Front (PSLF). 

The TNLA is known for their opposition to drug trade, conducting operations where they actively destroy poppy fields, heroin refineries and meth labs. The TNLA claims that they arrest opium smugglers regularly and the narcotics seized are publicly burned on special occasions to deter drug trade.

History 
The TNLA was originally founded as the Palaung State Liberation Organization/Army (PSLO/A), which signed a ceasefire agreement with the government in 1991 and disarmed in 2005. After the dissolution of the PSLO/A, Ta'ang (Palaung) leaders Tar Aik Bong and Tar Bone Kyaw founded the TNLA alongside the PSLF to continue fighting for the self-determination of the Ta'ang people. The TNLA is presently allied with the Kachin Independence Army and the Shan State Army - North, and have been conducting operations alongside them in northern Shan State.

Following the 2010 general election and constitutional reforms in 2011, the government created the Pa Laung Self-Administered Zone in northern Shan State as a special self-administration zone for the Ta'ang people. The region is one of the most underdeveloped in the country, with few schools and hospitals.

Clashes with Tatmadaw resumed after the military coup, with TNLA alongside its allies, AA and MNDAA, attacking a police station south of Lashio, killing at least 14 police officers and burning the station to the ground. TNLA and MNDAA further launched attacks in multiple locations in Northern Shan State on 4 and 5 May 2021, inflicting heavy casualties on the Myanmar military. 

Combined forces of TNLA and SSPP clashed with RCSS in March and April 2021, injuring several civilians and displacing thousands.

Tar Bone Kyaw, the second-in-command of TNLA, voiced his support for the National Unity Government formed in opposition to the military junta.

Abductions 

On October 17, 2020, TNLA abducted a local woman from Mogok and demanded 60 millions of kyats and beaten until ransoms were paid.

On December 5, 2020, also in Mogok, another local man was also abducted by TNLA.

References

External links 
 

Paramilitary organisations based in Myanmar
Rebel groups in Myanmar
Guerrilla organizations